or  were gangs of samurai in feudal Japan. First appearing in the Azuchi–Momoyama period (between the end of the Muromachi period in 1573 and the beginning of the Edo period in 1603) as the turbulent Sengoku period drew to a close,  were either , wandering samurai, or men who had once worked for samurai families who, during times of peace, formed street gangs. Some, however, were also members of more prominent clansmost notably Oda Nobunaga and Maeda Toshiie.

Etymology
The kanji used are ateji used for their pronunciation  not their inherent meaning.

Description
 would often dress in flamboyant clothing, disregarding traditional colours such as light yellow and dark blue, often accessorised by wearing  jackets with lead weights in the hem, velvet lapels, wide  belts and even women's clothes. Exoticism was characteristic and included items such as European clothing, Chinese hats,  vests made from Persian rugs.  also often had uncommon hairstyles and facial hair, either styled up in various fashions, or left to grow long. Their katana would often have fancy hilts, large or square , red scabbards and were usually longer than normal length. Some  even used extremely long  pipes as weapons.

Gang activities
 were known for their violent and unsociable behavior, such as not paying at restaurants or robbing townsfolk. Cases of the gang members cutting people down simply to test a new sword, or larger-scale violent incidents were common in areas where  could be found (particularly in large cities such as Edo and Kyoto). Wrestling, loud singing and dancing in the streets were also common, as was fighting between gangs after dark.

Later influence

See also 
 Bōsōzoku
 Hooliganism

References 

16th century in Japan
17th century in Japan
Yakuza
Samurai
Japanese words and phrases